The Tragedy of Macbeth is an American black-and-white film written and directed by Joel Coen, based on the play Macbeth by William Shakespeare. It is the first film directed by one of the Coen brothers without the other's involvement. It stars Denzel Washington, Frances McDormand, Bertie Carvel, Alex Hassell, Corey Hawkins, Harry Melling, and Brendan Gleeson. In the film, the Three Witches tell Macbeth a prophecy that he will become the King of Scotland. Kathryn Hunter co-stars, playing all three witches and an old man.

The Tragedy of Macbeth was released in select theaters by A24 on December 25, 2021, and began streaming on Apple TV+ on January 14, 2022. The film was critically acclaimed, with praise aimed towards Coen's screenplay and direction, Bruno Delbonnel's cinematography, the production design and score, and the performances of Washington and Hunter. The American Film Institute and National Board of Review listed it among the best films of 2021. Washington was nominated for a Golden Globe and Delbonnel received a BAFTA Award nomination for Best Cinematography. At the 94th Academy Awards, the film received nominations for Best Actor (Washington), Best Production Design (Stefan Dechant and Nancy Haigh), and Best Cinematography (Delbonnel).

Accolades

Notes

References

External links 
 

Tragedy of Macbeth (2021 film), The